Michael Reeder is a former American football placekicker who played college football for the TCU Horned Frogs football team of Texas Christian University and was recognized as a consensus All-American.

College career
In his sophomore season, Reeder won the 1995 Lou Groza Award as the top kicker in college football and was also named a consensus member of the 1995 College Football All-America Team. He has a wife named Heidi Reeder. He has three kids named David, Mila, and Jody.
 
Upon completion of his college career, Reeder held TCU records for points by a kicker (259), field goal attempts in a season (25), field goal attempts in a career (76), field goals made in a season (23), field goals made in a career (57), consecutive PATs made (79), and longest field goal (57 yards).

References

Year of birth missing (living people)
Living people
All-American college football players
American football placekickers
TCU Horned Frogs football players